This is a list of the chapters that comprise the manga series The Wallflower written by Tomoko Hayakawa.  The individual chapters had been serialized in Bessatsu Friend from 2000 to 2015, and in 36 tankōbon volumes in Japan by Kodansha. The series was licensed for an English language release in North America by Del Rey Manga, in Singapore by Chuang Yi under the name My Fair Lady, and in Indonesia by Level Comics under the name Perfect Girl Evolution. It is now licensed by Kodansha USA.

Chapter and volume list

References

Wallflower, The
The Wallflower (manga)